Edge Hill is an unincorporated community in Cheltenham Township in Montgomery County, Pennsylvania, United States. Edge Hill is located along Pennsylvania Route 152 between Pennsylvania Route 73 and Mount Carmel Avenue.

Edge Hill is a suburb of Philadelphia.

A stone quarry was established in Edge Hill in the 1880s.

References

Unincorporated communities in Montgomery County, Pennsylvania
Unincorporated communities in Pennsylvania
Cheltenham Township, Pennsylvania